George Ames Plimpton (March 18, 1927 – September 25, 2003) was an American writer. He is widely known for his sports writing and for helping to found The Paris Review, as well as his patrician demeanor and accent. He was also known for "participatory journalism," including accounts of his active involvement in professional sporting events, acting in a Western, performing a comedy act at Caesars Palace in Las Vegas, and playing with the New York Philharmonic Orchestra and then recording the experience from the point of view of an amateur.

Early life
Plimpton was born in New York City on March 18, 1927, and spent his childhood there, attending St. Bernard's School and growing up in an apartment duplex on Manhattan's Upper East Side located at 1165 Fifth Avenue. During the summers, he lived in the hamlet of West Hills, Huntington, Suffolk County on Long Island.

He was the son of Francis T. P. Plimpton and the grandson of Frances Taylor Pearsons and George Arthur Plimpton. His father was a successful corporate lawyer and partner of the law firm Debevoise and Plimpton; he was appointed by President John F. Kennedy as U.S. deputy ambassador to the United Nations, serving from 1961 to 1965.

His mother was Pauline Ames, the daughter of botanist Oakes Ames (1874-1950) and artist Blanche Ames. Both of Plimpton's maternal grandparents were born with the surname Ames; his mother was the granddaughter of Medal of Honor recipient Adelbert Ames (1835-1933), an American sailor, soldier, and politician, and Oliver Ames, a US political figure and the 35th Governor of Massachusetts (1887–1890). She was also the great-granddaughter on her father's side of Oakes Ames (1804–1873), an industrialist and congressman who was implicated in the Crédit Mobilier railroad scandal of 1872; and Governor-General of New Orleans Benjamin Franklin Butler, an American lawyer and politician who represented Massachusetts in the United States House of Representatives and later served as the 33rd Governor of Massachusetts.

Plimpton's son described him as a White Anglo-Saxon Protestant and wrote that both of Plimpton's parents were descended from Mayflower passengers.

George had three siblings: Francis Taylor Pearsons Plimpton Jr., Oakes Ames Plimpton, and Sarah Gay Plimpton.

Education
After St. Bernard's School, Plimpton attended Phillips Exeter Academy (from which he was expelled just shy of graduation), and Daytona Beach High School, where he received his high school diploma, before entering Harvard College in July 1944. He wrote for the Harvard Lampoon, was a member of the Hasty Pudding Club, Pi Eta, the Signet Society, and the Porcellian Club. He majored in English. Plimpton entered Harvard as a member of the Class of 1948, but did not graduate until 1950 due to intervening military service. He was also an accomplished birdwatcher.

Plimpton's studies at Harvard were interrupted by military service from 1945 to 1948, during which time he served in Italy as an  Army tank driver. After finishing at Harvard in 1950, he attended King's College, Cambridge, from 1950 to 1952, and graduated with third class honors in English.

Career

Literary criticism

In 1953, Plimpton joined the influential literary journal The Paris Review, founded by Peter Matthiessen, Thomas H. Guinzburg, and Harold L. "Doc" Humes, becoming its first editor in chief. This periodical has carried great weight in the literary world, but has never been financially strong; for its first half-century, it was allegedly largely financed by its publishers and by Plimpton. Peter Matthiessen took the magazine over from Humes and ousted him as editor, replacing him with Plimpton, using it as his cover for Matthiessen's CIA activities. Jean Stein became his co-editor. Plimpton was associated with the literary magazine in Paris, Merlin, which folded because the State Department withdrew its support. Future Poet Laureate Donald Hall, who had met Plimpton at Exeter, was Poetry Editor. One of the magazine's most notable discoveries was author and screenplay writer Terry Southern, who was living in Paris at the time and formed a lifelong friendship with Plimpton, along with writer Alexander Trocchi and future classical and jazz pioneer David Amram.

Sports journalism

Outside the literary world, Plimpton was famous for competing in professional sporting events and then recording the experience from the point of view of an amateur. In 1958, prior to a post-season exhibition game at Yankee Stadium between teams managed by Willie Mays (National League) and Mickey Mantle (American League), Plimpton pitched against the National League. His experience was captured in the book Out of My League. (He intended to face both line-ups, but tired badly and was relieved by Ralph Houk.) Plimpton sparred for three rounds with boxing greats Archie Moore and Sugar Ray Robinson while on assignment for Sports Illustrated.

In 1963, Plimpton attended preseason training with the Detroit Lions of the National Football League as a backup quarterback, and he ran a few plays in an intrasquad scrimmage. These events were recalled in his best-known book Paper Lion, which was later adapted into the 1968 feature film starring Alan Alda. Plimpton revisited pro football in 1971, this time joining the defending Super Bowl champion Baltimore Colts and seeing action in an exhibition game against his previous team, the Lions. These experiences served as the basis of another football book, Mad Ducks and Bears, although much of the book dealt with the off-field escapades and observations of football friends Alex Karras ("Mad Duck") and John Gordy ("Bear"). Another sports book, Open Net, saw him train as an ice hockey goalie with the Boston Bruins, even playing part of a National Hockey League preseason game.

Plimpton's The Bogey Man chronicles his attempt to play professional golf on the PGA Tour during the Nicklaus and Palmer era of the 1960s. Among other challenges for Sports Illustrated, he attempted to play top-level bridge, and spent some time as a high-wire circus performer. Some of these events, such as his stint with the Colts, and an attempt at stand-up comedy, were presented on the ABC television network as a series of specials.

In 1994, Plimpton appeared several times in the Ken Burns series Baseball, in which he shared some personal baseball experiences as well as other memorable events throughout the history of baseball.

Sidd Finch
In the April 1, 1985 issue of Sports Illustrated, Plimpton pulled off a widely reported April Fools' Day prank. With the help of the New York Mets organization and several Mets players, Plimpton wrote a convincing account of a new unknown pitcher in the Mets spring training camp named Siddhartha Finch, who threw a baseball over 160 mph, wore a heavy boot on one foot, and was a practicing Buddhist with a largely unknown background. The prank was so successful that many readers believed the story, and the ensuing popularity of the joke resulted in Plimpton's writing an entire book on Finch.

Other writing

A friend of the New England Sedgwick family, Plimpton edited Edie: An American Biography with Jean Stein in 1982. He also appeared in a featurette about Edie Sedgwick found on the Ciao! Manhattan DVD. He appeared in the PBS American Masters documentary on Andy Warhol. Plimpton also appeared in the closing credits of the 2006 film Factory Girl. Between 2000 and 2003, Plimpton wrote the libretto to a new opera, Animal Tales, commissioned by Family Opera Initiative, with music by Kitty Brazelton directed by Grethe Barrett Holby. He wrote, "I suppose in a mild way there is a lesson to be learned for the young, or the young at heart – the gumption to get out and try one's wings".

Acting
Plimpton also appeared in a number of feature films as an extra and in cameo appearances. He had a small role in the Oscar-winning film Good Will Hunting, playing a psychologist. Plimpton played Tom Hanks's antagonistic father in Volunteers. He was also notable for his appearance in television commercials during the early 1980s, including a memorable campaign for Mattel's Intellivision. In this campaign, Plimpton touted the superiority regarding the graphics and sounds of Intellivision video games over the Atari 2600.

He hosted Disney Channel's Mouseterpiece Theater (a Masterpiece Theatre spoof which featured Disney cartoon shorts). In the "I'm Spelling as Fast as I Can" episode of The Simpsons, he hosts the "Spellympics" and attempts to bribe Lisa Simpson to lose with the offer of a scholarship at a Seven Sisters College and a hot plate; "it's perfect for soup!" He had a recurring role as the grandfather of Dr. Carter on the NBC series ER. He also appeared in an episode of the NBC sitcom Wings.

Plimpton appeared in the 1989 documentary The Tightrope Dancer which featured the life and the work of the artist Vali Myers. He was one of her original supporters and had published an article about her work in The Paris Review. He also appeared in the 1996 documentary When We Were Kings about the "Rumble in the Jungle" 1974 Ali-Foreman Championship fight opposite Norman Mailer crediting Muhammad Ali as a poet who composed the world's shortest poem: "Me? Whee!!"

Plimpton was a member of the cast of the A&E TV series A Nero Wolfe Mystery (2001–02). In 2013, the documentary Plimpton! Starring George Plimpton as Himself, directed by Tom Bean and Luke Poling, was released. The film used archival audio and video of Plimpton lecturing and reading to create a posthumous narration.

Fireworks
Plimpton was a demolitions expert in the post-World War II Army. After returning to New York from Paris, he routinely launched fireworks at his evening parties.

His enthusiasm for fireworks grew, and he was appointed Fireworks Commissioner of New York by Mayor John Lindsay, an unofficial post he held until his death.

In 1975, in Bellport, Long Island, Plimpton, with Fireworks by Grucci attempted to break the record for the world's largest firework. A later attempt, fired at Cape Canaveral, rose approximately  into the air and broke 700 windows in Titusville, Florida.

With Felix Grucci, Plimpton competed in the 16th International Fireworks Festival in 1979 in Monte Carlo. After several problems with transporting and preparing the fireworks, Plimpton and Grucci became the first competitors from the United States to win the event. Plimpton later wrote the book Fireworks, and hosted an A&E Home Video with the same name featuring his many fireworks adventures with the Gruccis of New York in Monte Carlo and for the 1983 Brooklyn Bridge Centennial.

Parodies of Plimpton's career
A November 6, 1971, cartoon in The New Yorker by Whitney Darrow Jr. shows a cleaning lady on her hands and knees scrubbing an office floor while saying to another one: "I'd like to see George Plimpton do this sometime." In another cartoon in The New Yorker, a patient looks up at the masked surgeon about to operate on him and asks, "Wait a minute! How do I know you're not George Plimpton?" A feature in Mad titled "Some Really Dangerous Jobs for George Plimpton" spotlighted him trying to swim across Lake Erie, strolling through New York's Times Square in the middle of the night, and spending a week with Jerry Lewis.

Personal life
Plimpton was known for his distinctive accent which, by Plimpton's own admission, was often mistaken for an English accent. Plimpton himself described it as a "New England cosmopolitan accent" or "Eastern seaboard cosmopolitan" accent. His son, Taylor, described it as a mixture of "old New England, old New York, tinged with a hint of King's College King's English."

Plimpton was married twice. His first wife, whom he married in 1968 and divorced in 1988, was Freddy Medora Espy, a photographer's assistant. She was the daughter of writers Willard R. Espy and Hilda S. Cole, who had, earlier in her career, been a publicity agent for Kate Smith and Fred Waring. They had two children: Medora Ames Plimpton and Taylor Ames Plimpton, who has published a memoir entitled Notes from the Night: A Life After Dark.

In 1992, Plimpton married Sarah Whitehead Dudley, a graduate of Columbia University and a freelance writer. She is the daughter of James Chittenden Dudley, a managing partner of Manhattan-based investment firm Dudley and Company, and geologist Elisabeth Claypool. The Dudleys established the  Highstead Arboretum in Redding, Connecticut. Plimpton and Dudley were the parents of twin daughters Laura Dudley Plimpton and Olivia Hartley Plimpton.

Friendship with Robert F. Kennedy

At Harvard, Plimpton was a classmate and close personal friend of Robert F. Kennedy. Plimpton, along with former decathlete Rafer Johnson and American football star Rosey Grier, was credited with helping wrestle Sirhan Sirhan to the floor when Kennedy was assassinated following his victory in the 1968 California Democratic primary at the former Ambassador Hotel in Los Angeles, California. Kennedy died the next day at Good Samaritan Hospital.

Death and tributes
Plimpton died on September 25, 2003, in his New York City apartment from a heart attack later determined to have been caused by a catecholamine surge. He was 76.

An oral biography titled George, Being George was edited by Nelson W. Aldrich Jr., and released on October 21, 2008. The book offers memories of Plimpton from among other writers, such as Norman Mailer, William Styron, Gay Talese and Gore Vidal, and was written with the cooperation of both his ex-wife and his widow.

In the movie Plimpton! Starring George Plimpton as Himself, the writer James Salter said of Plimpton that "he was writing in a genre that really doesn't permit greatness."

In 2006, the musician Jonathan Coulton wrote the song entitled "A Talk with George", a part of his 'Thing a Week' series, in tribute to Plimpton's many adventures and approach to life.

Plimpton is the protagonist of the semi-fictional George Plimpton's Video Falconry, a 1983 ColecoVision game postulated by humorist John Hodgman and recreated by video game auteur Tom Fulp.

Researcher and writer Samuel Arbesman filed with NASA to name an asteroid after Plimpton; NASA issued the certificate 7932 Plimpton in 2009.
His final interview appeared in The New York Sports Express of October 2, 2003 by journalist Dave Hollander.

Selected works

Publications

Author
Letters in Training (letters to home from Italy, privately printed, 1946)
The Rabbit's Umbrella (children's book, 1955)
Out of My League (baseball, 1961)
Go Caroline, (about Caroline Kennedy, privately printed, 1963)
Paper Lion (about his experience playing professional football with the Detroit Lions, 1966)
The Bogey Man (about his experiences travelling with the PGA Tour, 1967)
Mad Ducks and Bears (about Detroit Lions linemen Alex Karras and John Gordy, with extensive chapters focused on Hall of Fame quarterback Bobby Layne and Plimpton's return to football, this time with the Baltimore Colts, 1973)
One for the Record: The Inside Story of Hank Aaron's Chase for the Home Run Record  (1974)
Shadow Box (about boxing, author's bout with Archie Moore, Ali-Foreman showdown in Zaire, 1977)
One More July (about the last NFL training camp of former Packer and future coach Bill Curry, 1977)
Fireworks: A History and Celebration (1984)
Open Net (about his experience playing professional ice hockey with the Boston Bruins, 1985)
The X Factor: A Quest for Excellence (1990)
The Best of Plimpton (1990)
Truman Capote: In Which Various Friends, Enemies, Acquaintances, and Detractors Recall His Turbulent Career (1997)
The Man in the Flying Lawn Chair: And Other Excursions and Observations (2004)

Editor
 Writers at Work (The Paris Review Interviews), several volumes
 American Journey: the Times of Robert Kennedy (with Jean Stein)
 As Told at the Explorers Club: More Than Fifty Gripping Tales of Adventure.
 “Edie: An American Girl”

Introductions
 The Writer's Chapbook: A Compendium of Fact, Opinion, Wit, and Advice from the 20th Century's Preeminent Writers
 Above New York, by Robert Cameron

Film appearances
Lawrence of Arabia (1962) – Bedouin (uncredited)
Beyond the Law (1968) – Mayor
Hickory Hill (1968) – narrator in Richard Leacock's documentary on the Annual Spring Pet Show at Robert F. Kennedy's Virginia estate, Hickory Hill (McLean, Virginia)
The Detective (1968) – Reporter (uncredited)
Paper Lion (1968) – Plimpton, played by Alan Alda, is the lead character in the largely fictional film, loosely based on the 1966 nonfiction book. Anecdotally, Plimpton appeared in the film in an uncredited cameo in a crowd scene.
Rio Lobo (1970) – 4th Gunman (Plimpton's preparation and filming for his role as "Fourth Gunman" was the subject of a 1972 television program.)
The Private Files of J. Edgar Hoover (1977) – Quentin Reynolds
If Ever I See You Again (1978) – Lawrence Lawrence
Reds (1981) – Horace Whigham
Garbo Talks (1984) – Himself (uncredited)
Volunteers (1985) – Lawrence Bourne Jr.
A Fool and His Money (1989) – God
Easy Wheels (1989) – Surgeon
The Bonfire of the Vanities (1990) – Well Wisher
L.A. Story (1991) – Straight Weatherman
Little Man Tate (1991) – Winston F. Buckner
Ken Burns' Baseball (1994) – Himself
Just Cause (1995) – Elder Phillips
Nixon (1995) – President's Lawyer
When We Were Kings (1996) – Himself – Writer
Good Will Hunting (Miramax, 1997) – Henry Lipkin – Psychologist
The Last Days of Disco (1998) – Clubgoer
EDtv (1999) – Panel Member
Just Visiting (2001) – Dr. Brady
Sam the Man (2001) – Himself
The Devil and Daniel Webster (2003) – Himself (uncredited)
Factory Girl (2006) – Himself
Soul Power (2008) – Himself
Plimpton! Starring George Plimpton as Himself (2012) – Himself

Television appearances
Plimpton! The Man on the Flying Trapeze, (documentary), himself, ABC, February 1971
Mouseterpiece Theater, host, himself, Disney Channel, 1983–1984
Uncensored Channels: TV Around the World with George Plimpton, 1986
The Civil War, reading the diary of New Yorker, George Templeton Strong, 1990
Wings, "The Shrink", Dr. Grayson 1994
 Voice, Baseball: A Film by Ken Burns, PBS 1994
Married... with Children, 200 Episode Special Host "Best O' Bundy" 1995
ER, playing "John Truman Carter, Sr.", 1998 and 2001
Saturday Night Live, as himself, uncredited, 1999 and 2002. In the March 13 episode of Saturday Night Live Season 1, he is one of the audience cutaway shots (usually featured in the early seasons with comedic and fictitious non-sequitur captions as to who the audience member was, or what they did). He is labelled as having "Roomed with Wendy Yoshimura".
Just Shoot Me, playing himself in the show's A&E Biography of fictional character 'Nina Van Horn', 2000
A Nero Wolfe Mystery (2001–02) – Member of the repertory cast, playing various roles in "Eeny Meeny Murder Mo", "Over My Dead Body", "Death of a Doxy", "Murder Is Corny", "Help Wanted, Male", "The Silent Speaker" and "Immune to Murder"
The Simpsons, playing himself in the episode "I'm Spelling as Fast as I Can", originally aired February 16, 2003

Commercial appearances on television
Oldsmobile Vista Cruiser, pitchman, himself, released by Oldsmobile in late 1968 for the 1969 model year
Intellivision, pitchman, himself, released by Mattel in 1980. Plimpton was featured in a string of Intellivision commercials and print ads in the early 1980s.
 "Pop-Secret", pitchman, himself.

Literary characterizations
Plimpton appears as a character in Philip Roth's novel, Exit Ghost.

See also

Notes

References
Aldrich, Nelson W. George, Being George: George Plimpton's Life as Told, Admired, Deplored, and Envied by 200 Friends, Relatives, Lovers, Acquaintances, Rivals—and a Few Unappreciative Observers New York. Publisher: Random House, Inc., 2009 .
Chase, Levi Badger. A genealogy and historical notices of the family of Plimpton or Plympton in America: and of Plumpton in England (1884) Publisher: Plimpton Mfg. Company 1884.
Miller, Alice Duer. A History of Barnard College: The First Fifty Years  New York. Publisher: Columbia University Press (January 1, 1939).

Further reading
 Aldrich, Nelson W.George, Being George: George Plimpton's Life as Told, Admired, Deplored, and Envied by 200 Friends, Relatives, Lovers, Acquaintances, Rivals—and a Few Unappreciative Observers. New York: Random House, 2009. .
 Chase, Levi Badger A genealogy and historical notices of the family of Plimpton or Plympton in America and of Plumpton in England. Plimpton Mfg. Company 1884.
 Swetz, Frank, J. (1987). Capitalism and Arithmetic. La Salle: Open Court.
  The author describes his years of working with Plimpton in Paris.
  An essay by George Plimpton.

External links

 1969 St. Louis Literary Award Recipient
 
 
Animal Tales Official Site

1927 births
2003 deaths
20th-century American journalists
21st-century American journalists
Alumni of King's College, Cambridge
American expatriates in the United Kingdom
American magazine editors
American magazine founders
American male actors
American male journalists
20th-century American memoirists
United States Army personnel of World War II
Assassination of Robert F. Kennedy
Butler–Ames family
Detroit Lions players
The Harvard Lampoon alumni
Harvard College alumni
Mainland High School alumni
Military personnel from New York City
Journalists from New York City
People from the Upper East Side
People from West Hills, New York
Phillips Exeter Academy alumni
The Paris Review
United States Army soldiers
Writers from Manhattan
World Football League announcers
Hasty Pudding alumni
St. Bernard's School alumni
Sportswriters from New York (state)